The Providence Huskies was a professional American football team based in Providence, Rhode Island. The team possibly descended from the Providence Steam Roller, a team that played in the National Football League from 1924 to 1931 and likewise had a husky as its mascot and logo. The team was owned by Sam Rushton who served as an owner, manager and (at 50 years old) player for the team. While largely forgotten by history, the Providence Huskies possibly rank as the most perfect team in semi pro and professional football history for both being undefeated and for holding their opponents scoreless for a flawless 10–0 season . The team apparently folded after one season.

References

American football teams established in 1933
Defunct National Football League teams
American football teams in Rhode Island
1933 establishments in Rhode Island